Mornington Crescent is a street in the London Borough of Camden. 

Mornington Crescent may also refer to:

 Mornington Crescent tube station, situated at the northern end of the street
 Mornington Crescent (game), a spoof game named after the station, as played on the BBC Radio 4 show I'm Sorry, I Haven't a Clue
 "Mornington Crescent", a track on the Belle and Sebastian album The Life Pursuit
 "Mornington Crescent", a track on the Bonzo Dog Doo-Dah Band album Pour l'Amour des Chiens
 Mornington Crescent, a 1995 album by the British band My Life Story
 Mornington Crescent, a painting by Walter Richard Sickert
 "Mornington Crescent", an esoteric programming language based on the BBC Radio 4 game
 Mornington Crescent, Singapore, a street in Seletar